Renzo Gracie Academy is a martial arts school headed by Renzo Gracie, located in Midtown Manhattan.

Overview
Renzo Gracie founded the academy in 1996. It was originally above a methadone clinic before it moved to its current location at 224 West 30th Street.

It was one of the camps participating in the International Fight League. Coached by Gracie, it took the place of the New York Pitbulls who were the 2007 IFL champions. The camp was established in 2008 when the IFL switched to a more camp based system than a team based system.

Notable people

Grapplers 

 Renzo Gracie
 Gordon Ryan
 Garry Tonon
 Nick Rodriguez
 John Danaher
 Ricardo Almeida

Fighters 

 Georges St. Pierre
 Matt Serra
 Chris Weidman 
 Gunnar Nelson
 Corey Anderson
 Jim Miller
 Dan Miller
 Jared Gordon
 Rafael Natal
 Phillipe Nover
 Neiman Gracie
 Rolles Gracie Jr.
 Daniel Gracie
 David Branch 
 Wagnney Fabiano 
 Deividas Taurosevičius 
 Fábio Leopoldo 
 Heather Hardy

Others 

 Chatri Sityodtong
 Harley Flanagan

External links 
 Official Website

References 

International Fight League
Sports in New York City
Gracie family
Mixed martial arts in New York (state)